Matt Boyd or Matthew Boyd may refer to:

People
 Matthew Boyd (Australian footballer) (born 1982), Australian rules football player 
 Matthew Boyd (baseball) (born 1991), American baseball player
 Matt Boyd (writer), co-creator of the webcomic Mac Hall

Fictional characters
 Matt Boyd, a fictional character played by Richard Dreyfuss in Piranha 3D